The Clypeosphaeriaceae are a family of fungi in the order Xylariales.

Genera
As accepted by GBIF;
Amerostege 
Apioclypea  (6)
Apiorhynchostoma  (4)
Aquasphaeria (1)
Brunneiapiospora  (9)
Clypeosphaeria  (40)
Crassoascus  (3)
Curvatispora  (1)
Duradens  (1)
Entosordaria (6)
Palmomyces (1)
Pseudovalsaria  (4)
Stereosphaeria  (1)

Figures in brackets are approx. how many species per genus.

References

Xylariales
Ascomycota families